Brian Samuel Dixon (born April 26, 1990) is a former American football cornerback. He played college football at Northwest Missouri State. He signed with the New Orleans Saints as an undrafted free agent in 2014.

College career
Dixon played college football at Joliet Junior College and would later transfer to Northwest Missouri State.

Dixon had 30 tackles and five interceptions in his Junior season at Northwest Missouri State. Dixon Had 21 tackles, 6 passes defensed, one interception, and two forced fumbles while he and his twin brother Brandon both starters help lead the Northwest Missouri State football team to win the 2013 NCAA Division II Football Championship in his senior season.

Professional career

New Orleans Saints
On May 12, 2014, Dixon was signed by the New Orleans Saints as undrafted free agent.

On November 5, 2015, the Saints signed Brian's twin brother Brandon Dixon to their practice squad. This made them the only set of twins to play on the same team since the AFL-NFL merger and the first since 1926. They are the twelfth set of twins to play in the NFL and along with the Pounceys and the McCourtys, are the third active set of twins currently playing in the NFL.

On September 3, 2016, he was waived by the Saints. He was then signed to the Saints' practice squad. He was promoted to the active roster on October 1, 2016. He was released and re-signed to the practice squad on October 10. He was promoted to the active roster on October 13, 2016. He was released by the Saints on November 9, 2016 and was re-signed to the practice squad.

Arizona Cardinals
On December 28, 2016, Dixon was signed by the Cardinals off the Saints' practice squad. On May 2, 2017, Dixon was waived by the Cardinals.

Jacksonville Jaguars
On May 22, 2017, Dixon was signed by the Jacksonville Jaguars. He was waived on September 2, 2017.

Personal life
Dixon's twin brother, Brandon, was drafted by the New York Jets in the sixth round, (195th overall) of the 2014 NFL Draft.

References

External links
 New Orleans Saints profile
 Joliet Junior College profile

1990 births
Living people
American football cornerbacks
Arizona Cardinals players
Jacksonville Jaguars players
Joliet Wolves football players
New Orleans Saints players
Northwest Missouri State Bearcats football players
People from Pompano Beach, Florida
Players of American football from Florida
Sportspeople from Broward County, Florida